Youku is a leading Chinese video hosting service since 2006.

Original programmings 

Numbers of Youku original programs:

Co-productions

References 

Youku original programming
Lists of television series by network
Youku